Canada is scheduled to compete at the 2023 Pan American Games in Santiago, Chile from October 20 to November 5, 2023. This was Canada's 18th appearance at the Pan American Games, having competed at every Games since the second edition in 1955.

Competitors
The following is the list of number of competitors (per gender) participating at the games per sport/discipline.

Archery

Canada qualified eight archers during the 2022 Pan American Archery Championships.

Men

Women

Mixed

Artistic swimming

Canada automatically qualified a full team of nine artistic swimmers.

Badminton

Canada qualified two athletes through the 2021 Junior Pan American Games in Cali, Colombia.

Men
Brian Yang

Women
Rachel Chan

Basketball

5x5

Men's tournament

Canada qualified a men's team (of 12 athletes) by finishing fourth in the 2022 FIBA Americup.
Summary

3x3

Women's tournament

Canada qualified a women's team (of 4 athletes) by winning the 2022 FIBA 3x3 AmeriCup.
Summary

Bowling

Canada qualified two men through the 2022 PABCON Champion of Champions held in Rio de Janeiro, Brazil.

Canoeing

Sprint
Canada qualified a total of 18 sprint athletes (nine men and nine women).

Men

Women

Cycling

BMX
Canada qualified four cyclists (two men and two women) in BMX race through the UCI World Rankings.

Racing

Fencing

Canada qualified a full team of 18 fencers (nine men and nine women), after all six teams finished at least in the top seven at the 2022 Pan American Fencing Championships in Ascuncion, Paraguay.

Individual
Men

Women

Team

Field hockey

Men's tournament

Canada qualified a men's team (of 16 athletes) by finishing 3rd at the 2022 Pan American Cup.

Summary

Women's tournament

Canada qualified a women's team (of 16 athletes) by finishing 3rd at the 2022 Pan American Cup.

Summary

Football

Women's tournament

Canada qualified a women's team of 18 athletes by finishing 2nd in the 2022 CONCACAF W Championship.
Summary

Handball

Women's tournament

Canada qualified a women's team (of 14 athletes) by winning the USA-CAN Qualifying Round.

Summary

Karate

Canada qualified one athlete through the 2021 Junior Pan American Games in Cali, Colombia.

Women
Yamina Lahyanssa

Modern pentathlon

Canada qualified four modern pentathletes (two men and two women).

Rugby sevens

Men's tournament

Canada men's team is automatically qualified to the Pan American Games.

Summary

Women's tournament

Canada women's team is automatically qualified to the Pan American Games.

Summary

Sailing

Canada has qualified 5 boats for a total of 6 sailors.

 Men

 Women

Shooting

Canada qualified a total of 17 shooters in the 2022 Americas Shooting Championships.

Men
Pistol and rifle

Men
Shotgun

Women
Pistol and rifle

Women
Shotgun

Softball

Canada qualified a women's team (of 18 athletes) by virtue of its campaign in the 2022 Pan American Championships.

Summary

Water polo

Men's tournament

Canada automatically qualified a men's team (of 11 athletes).

Summary

Women's tournament

Canada automatically qualified a women's team (of 11 athletes).

Summary

Water skiing

Canada qualified two wakeboarders (one of each gender) during the 2022 Pan American Championship.

Canada also qualified four water skiers during the 2022 Pan American Water skiing Championship.

Men

Women

Wakeboard
Men

Women

Wrestling

Canada qualified eight wrestlers (Freestyle: men's 57 kg, 65 kg, 97 kg and 125 kg) (Women's freestyle: 50 kg, 57 kg, 62 kg and 76 kg) through the 2022 Pan American Wrestling Championships held in Acapulco, Mexico.

Men

Women

See also
Canada at the 2023 Parapan American Games
Canada at the 2024 Summer Olympics

References

Nations at the 2023 Pan American Games
2023
2023 in Canadian sports